Bluffton High School is a public high school located in Bluffton, Indiana, United States.

Curriculum

Classes
Bluffton uses four class periods of one hour and twenty-five minutes each, as opposed to the seven-period system used at other schools. Bluffton offers various honors, AP, and dual-credit classes in social studies, science, mathematics, and English. Dual-credit engineering and vocational classes are also offered.

Diplomas 
Along with most Indiana high schools, Bluffton has adopted a credit system called Core 40, requiring 40 credits — four years of English, three years of math, social studies, and science, and ten to twelve elective credits, plus two semesters of physical education, and a credit in health education. Bluffton also offers a slightly more rigorous Academic Honors Diploma, which requires 47 credits, and a basic one which requires 40 credits like Core 40, but lowers the bar in the Core 40 six-credit subjects to just four credits.

Notable alumni
 D'Wayne Eskridge - Professional football player for the Seattle Seahawks
Adam Ballinger - National Basketball Association (Australia) / NCAA
Verdi Karns, ragtime composer, class of 1901
 Everett Scott - Major League Baseball

See also
 List of high schools in Indiana

References

External links
 Bluffton High School website

Public high schools in Indiana
Education in Wells County, Indiana